The Bera District is a district in southwestern Pahang, Malaysia, bordering Negeri Sembilan and Johor.

Background
Bera district was founded on January 1, 1992, detaching it from Temerloh District. Once considered as problematic area (illegal land exploration), Bera emerged as an important district especially in the agriculture sector.

Etymology
The district got its name from Malaysia's largest freshwater lake, Tasik Bera. According to the Orang Asli of the Semelai tribe, Bera derived its name from a type of seaweed known as Reba.

When the northern part of the district was ruled by one of the nine founding chiefdoms of Negeri Sembilan, it was known as "Ulu Pahang" (the back part of Pahang).

Geography
Located in the south-western corner of Pahang, the district borders Temerloh District and Maran District on the north, Rompin District on the east, Bentong District on the west and Jempol District of Negeri Sembilan on the south-west. 

Bera district is known for Bera Lake, a freshwater lake and its surrounding wetlands, that has been protected under the Ramsar Convention since November 1994.

The major towns in Bera are Bandar Bera and Teriang. Other towns include Mengkuang, Kemayan, Kerayong and Mengkarak.

From the south, KTM tracks enter Pahang state via this constituency, stopping at Kemayan, Triang and Mengkarak stations.

Demographics

The following is based on Department of Statistics Malaysia 2010 census.

Education 

There are 38 primary schools, which include national schools, Chinese-medium schools and Indian-medium schools, in  Bera district. As for secondary schools, there are 10 of them.

Federal Parliament and State Assembly Seats
Though Bera was made into a separate district in 1992, it wasn't given a vote in the parliament until 2004. Previously Bera was represented in the national parliament as part of Temerloh.

Ismail Sabri Yaakob, the former Prime Minister of Malaysia, is the member of parliament.

Bera district representative in the Federal Parliament (Dewan Rakyat) 

List of Bera district representatives in the State Legislative Assembly (Dewan Undangan Negeri)

Subdistricts

Bera has 2 mukim or subdistricts.
Bera (165,094 Ha)
Teriang (56,350 Ha) (Capital)

See also
 Districts of Malaysia

References

External links 
Official website of Bera District Council